Andrew Christopher Pruski (born November 11, 1978) is an American politician. He is a member of the Maryland House of Delegates for District 33A in Anne Arundel County, Maryland. He was previously a member of the Anne Arundel County Council from 2014 to 2022, serving as its chair from 2018 to 2019 and its vice-chair from 2021 to 2022.

Background
Pruski was born in Batavia, New York, on November 11, 1978. He graduated from Niagara University, earning his Bachelors of Arts in history in 2000 and his Master of Science in secondary education in 2001.

Shortly after graduating, Pruski became a social studies teacher at Frederick Douglass High School. In October 2003, he participated in a school employees protest at the Prince George's County Public Schools headquarters over stalled contract negotiations and persistent payroll errors. Although the school board reached a contract with the teacher's union in December, Pruski expressed discontent with the deal, saying "There are a lot of issues on the table we need to discuss. It's not just the contract." Pruski later worked as an assessment supervisor for Baltimore County Public Schools from 2005 to 2014, and for Prince George's County Public Schools since 2014.

Pruski entered politics in 2006, running unsuccessfully for the Anne Arundel County Council and losing to Jamie Benoit in the Democratic primary. In the same year, he was appointed to the Anne Arundel County Board of Appeals, where he served until 2009, when he was elected to the Anne Arundel County Board of Education.

In August 2013, Pruski announced that he would again run for the Anne Arundel County Council in District 4. Pruski narrowly won the Democratic primary on June 24, 2014, edging out his opponent by 151 votes. Afterwards, Pruski resigned from the Anne Arundel County Board of Education, complying with a state law that prohibits candidates from appearing on a general election ballot for more than one paid position. Pruski won the general election on November 4, defeating Republican challenger Chike Anyanwu with 57.5 percent of the vote.

Anne Arundel County Council
Pruski was sworn into the Anne Arundel County Council on December 1, 2014. He was re-elected in 2018, making him the only incumbent council member who was not term limited and was not defeated in the primary election. In December 2018, Pruski was unanimously elected to serve as the county council's chairman.

In September 2021, Pruski said he was considering a run for the Maryland House of Delegates, but said his decision depended on the legislative maps drawn by the General Assembly. He filed to run for delegate in District 33, later being redrawn into District 33A, in December. He won the Democratic primary on July 19, 2022, receiving 52.2 percent of the vote. He won the general election on November 8, defeating Republican challenger Kim Mills.

In the legislature
Pruski was sworn into the Maryland House of Delegates on January 11, 2023, with the start of the Maryland General Assembly's 445th legislative session. He is a member of the House Economic Matters Committee.

Personal life
Pruski is married to his wife, Roxanne, who as of 2013 is an assistant at Broadneck High School. Together, they have three children and live in Gambrills, Maryland.

Political positions

Education
Pruski supports the Blueprint for Maryland's Future, a sweeping education reform bill passed by the legislature during the 2020 legislative session that would provide schools with $3.8 billion a year for 10 years, but thinks that teachers should be paid more apart from the raises outlined in the Blueprint.

In January 2010, Pruski voted against the expansion of charter middle schools through ninth grade.

In May 2019, Pruski said he supported county executive Steuart Pittman's first budget, which included $46 million in additional funding for education paid for through increased income and property taxes.

Environment
In March 2015, Pruski said he opposed a full repeal of Maryland's "Rain Tax", but supported finding ways to reduce the fees imposed by the tax. In April, he voted against bills that would repeal the stormwater fee in Anne Arundel County.

In October 2016, Pruski wrote to the Anne Arundel County Delegation to ask legislators to support a bill that would ban fracking during the 2017 legislative session.

Gun control
In January 2022, Pruski introduced a bill that requires gun store owners to install video surveillance, exterior bollards, and concrete barriers to prevent smash-and-grab style burglaries at gun stores. The bill passed and was signed into law by county executive Steuart Pittman on January 4, 2022.

Housing
In June 2019, Pruski introduced a bill that would give workforce housing a 50 percent discount on capital connection charges and expands the types of zones allowing that housing.

In June 2020, Pruski voted against a bill that would limit where assisted living facilities could be built in residential areas.

In July 2020, Pruski introduced a bill that would pause rent increases of 3 percent or more during the COVID-19 pandemic, until 120 days after the state's emergency declaration is lifted. The bill passed in a 4-3 vote.

Marijuana
In September 2015, Pruski introduced a bill that would limit where medical marijuana dispensaries could be built.

National politics
In July 2019, Pruski endorsed Joe Biden in the 2020 Democratic presidential primary.

In February 2021, Pruski voted for a resolution that condemned the January 6 United States Capitol attack and called for the disqualification of President Donald Trump from holding office again.

Social issues
In September 2018, Pruski voted against a resolution introduced by councilmember Michael Peroutka that would have recognized "preborn" children as human and deserving of humane treatment and protection. In July 2022, following the Supreme Court's decisions in Dobbs v. Jackson Women's Health Organization, Pruski voted for a resolution in the Anne Arundel County Council supporting a women's access to reproductive health care.

Electoral history

References

External links
 

1978 births
21st-century American politicians
Democratic Party members of the Maryland House of Delegates
Living people
Niagara University alumni
People from Batavia, New York
County commissioners in Maryland
Schoolteachers from Maryland
Members of Anne Arundel County Council